Abdallah Jaber (born 17 February 1993) is a Palestinian professional footballer who plays as a left-back for Israeli Premier League club Maccabi Bnei Reineh.

He played for and captained the Palestine national team until he was banned from it due to him playing for an Israeli Premier League club in 2020. He is the youngest Palestinian footballer to amass 35 international caps, having started 35 of Palestine's 40 games between May 2014 and August 2018.

Early life
Jaber was born in Tayibe, Israel, to a Muslim-Arab family. His grandfather Abdullah and his father Nabil were renowned local footballers in his hometown. His younger brother Mahmoud Jaber is also a professional footballer, although he plays for the Israel national team since 2 June 2022.

Club career

He made his senior debut for Israeli Premier League club Ironi Ramat HaSharon in the 2011–12 season playing 23 minutes as a substitute. He was part of the team that finished sixth (the club's best ever finish) in the league the following season.

Move to West Bank Premier League
Jaber made the decision to move to the Palestinian league signing with Hilal Al-Quds of the West Bank Premier League in 2013–14. He won the Palestine Cup that season with Hilal at the end of his first season.

Jaber made his AFC Cup debut with Hilal in 2015 and helped keep a clean sheet in a playoff draw against eventual quarterfinalists Al-Jaish.

At the beginning of the 2015–16 season, Jaber elected to sign with Ahli Al-Khalil.

Move to Egyptian Premier League
In August 2016, Abdallah Jaber agreed a three-year deal with Al Mokawloon Al Arab of the Egyptian Premier League. His contract was voided three days later. The following year, Jaber signed for Alexandria-based Al Ittihad, but the deal was voided again with the club revealing that the player's Israeli passport had nullified his registration with the Egyptian Football Association.

Move to Israeli Premier League

Hapoel Hadera
On 25 May 2020, Jaber signed with Israeli Premier League club Hapoel Hadera on a free transfer from Hilal Al-Quds.

Bnei Sakhnin
On 29 May 2021, Jaber signed with Israeli club Bnei Sakhnin.

International career
Abdallah Jaber earned his first cap, aged 21, in the 2014 AFC Challenge Cup opening game when Palestine faced Kyrgyzstan. Despite his inexperience he helped Palestine keep a clean sheet in a game they won 1–0. He played 360 of the 450 minutes of the tournament helping Palestine lift the title without conceding a goal en route to their first AFC Asian Cup appearance.

His first international goal came in his 8th cap in a 2–0 friendly win vs. Pakistan. He scored his second goal in October 2017, in a 2019 AFC Asian Cup qualification match against Bhutan.

At the 2015 AFC Asian Cup he was one of only two Palestine players to start and play every single minute of the tournament. His performances were widely regarded as one of the few highlights of an otherwise dour campaign that saw Palestine lose all three games.

Jaber remained a crucial player for Palestine, having started and played every single minute of the side's 2018 FIFA World Cup qualification.

He played for as well as captained the Palestine national team, until he was banned from it, due to him playing for an Israeli Premier League club in 2020. He is the youngest Palestinian footballer to amass 35 international caps, having started 35 of Palestine's 40 games between May 2014 and August 2018.

Career statistics

International goals
Scores and results list Palestine's goal tally first.

Achievements
 AFC Challenge Cup
Winner (1): 2014

 Palestine Cup
Winner (5):  2013–14, 2014–15, 2014–15, 2015–16, 2016–17

 Palestine Super Cup
Winner (2): 2014, 2015

 Yasser Arafat Cup
Winner (1): 2014

External links

References

1993 births
Living people
Palestinian footballers
Palestine international footballers
Israeli footballers
Arab-Israeli footballers
Israeli Muslims
Palestinian Muslims
Palestinian people of Israeli descent
Israeli people of Palestinian descent
Association football defenders
Footballers at the 2014 Asian Games
Hapoel Nir Ramat HaSharon F.C. players
Hilal Al-Quds Club players
Ahli Al-Khaleel players
Hapoel Hadera F.C. players
Bnei Sakhnin F.C. players
Maccabi Bnei Reineh F.C. players
Israeli Premier League players
West Bank Premier League players
People from Tayibe
Footballers from Central District (Israel)
2015 AFC Asian Cup players
2019 AFC Asian Cup players
Asian Games competitors for Palestine
Arab citizens of Israel